Moisés Vieira da Veiga (born 2 September 1996), simply known as Moisés, is a Brazilian footballer who plays as a forward for Fortaleza.

Club career
Born in Morro da Fumaça, Santa Catarina, Moisés played amateur football until joining Hercílio Luz in 2019. He appeared in his first senior match on 16 January of that year, playing the last five minutes of a 2–2 Campeonato Catarinense away draw against Atlético Tubarão; he scored his first goal ten days later, in a 4–0 home routing of Metropolitano.

After being mainly used as a substitute, Moisés was loaned to Concórdia for the second division of the Catarinense. After achieving promotion to the top tier and being the top goalscorer of the tournament, he signed a permanent contract with the club.

On 23 September 2019, Moisés moved to Brusque on loan for the year's Copa Santa Catarina. He returned to his parent club in December, after lifting the trophy and being again the top goalscorer.

On 5 June 2020, Moisés renewed his contract with Concórdia until 2022. Late in the month, he agreed to a loan deal with Série B side Ponte Preta until April 2021.

Initially a backup option, Moisés started to feature regularly during the 2020 Série B, and scored a hat-trick in a 7–2 away success over Figueirense on 29 January 2021. On 3 May, Ponte signed him permanently on a contract until 2024.

Career statistics

Honours
Brusque
Copa Santa Catarina: 2019

Fortaleza
Copa do Nordeste: 2022
Campeonato Cearense: 2022

References

External links
Ponte Preta profile 

1996 births
Living people
Sportspeople from Santa Catarina (state)
Brazilian footballers
Association football forwards
Campeonato Brasileiro Série A players
Campeonato Brasileiro Série B players
Campeonato Brasileiro Série D players
Hercílio Luz Futebol Clube players
Concórdia Atlético Clube players
Brusque Futebol Clube players
Associação Atlética Ponte Preta players
Fortaleza Esporte Clube players